Igor Peshkov (born 7 January 1965) is a Kazakhstani judoka. He competed in the men's heavyweight event at the 1996 Summer Olympics.

References

External links
 

1965 births
Living people
Kazakhstani male judoka
Olympic judoka of Kazakhstan
Judoka at the 1996 Summer Olympics
Place of birth missing (living people)
20th-century Kazakhstani people
21st-century Kazakhstani people